Fonderie Paccard is a French foundry in Annecy. Founded in 1796, the foundry has cast more than 120,000 bells located throughout the world. The foundry has been continuously operated by seven generations of the Paccard family. The largest bell cast by Paccard is the World Peace Bell.

Paccard is best known in the United States for its participation in the Liberty Bell Savings Bond Project. As part of the Marshall Plan, the foundry cast 57 replicas of the Liberty Bell in 1950 and 1951. Most of the bells were distributed, one each, to the then-48 U.S. states as tributes to their citizens' respective services in World War II. Most of the Liberty Bell Project bells survive and are on public display.

References

External links 
 Paccard website

Bell foundries
Carillon makers
French companies established in 1796
Manufacturing companies established in 1796
Musical instrument manufacturing companies of France